Willie Joseph Holman (February 27, 1945 – April 21, 2002) was an American football defensive end in the National Football League for the Chicago Bears and the Washington Redskins.  He played college football at South Carolina State University and was drafted in the seventh round of the 1968 NFL Draft.

1945 births
2002 deaths
American football defensive ends
Chicago Bears players
People from St. Matthews, South Carolina
Players of American football from Columbia, South Carolina
South Carolina State Bulldogs football players
Washington Redskins players